Ramón Ignacio Unzaga Asla (18 July 1892 – 31 August 1923) was a footballer who played as a left-half. Born in Spain, he appeared for the Chile national team at international level.

Life
Born in Bilbao, Spain, he emigrated to Talcahuano, Chile, in 1906 at 14 years of age, with his parents. In 1912 the twenty-year-old Unzaga impressed the Talcahuano sports delegation with his football ability, so they signed him to the football club. He began his career and adopted the Chilean nationality. Unzaga is attributed as the first person to create the bicycle kick, devising the move playing for his club team in 1914 in El Morro stadium of Talcahuano. The kick is labeled the chorera in honor of the team he played for that was called the escuela chorera (chorera school) at the time. In the Copa America of 1916 and 1920 playing for the Chile national team, Unzaga repeated the kick on various occasions in which the Argentine press labels the kick as la chilena.

Unzaga received many offers to play with international football clubs but always chose to stay with Club Atlético y de Fútbol Estrella de Mar of Talcahuano. On 15 May 2014, the municipality of Talcahuano inaugurated a monument of Ramon Unzaga in his honor.

Since that Unzaga's move was born in the El Morro Stadium, is in its honor that the stadium was renamed after him.

References

External links
 Ramón Unzaga at PartidosdeLaRoja.com 
 Ramón Unzaga at NuevaEstrelladelMar.com 

1892 births
1923 deaths
Footballers from Bilbao
Spanish emigrants to Chile
Spanish expatriates in Chile
Spanish footballers
Naturalized citizens of Chile
Chilean footballers
Chilean people of Basque descent
Chile international footballers
Spanish expatriate sportspeople in Chile
Expatriate footballers in Chile
Association football midfielders